is a song written by Kazumi Yasui and Makoto Kawaguchi. It was originally recorded by Michiru Maki as the B-side of her 1969 single .

Mie Nakao version 

"Kataomoi" was covered by Mie Nakao and released as a single on November 5, 1971, by Victor Entertainment. The single did not chart upon its release, but requests for the song on a Sapporo radio station in March 1977 prompted Victor to reissue the single on June 10. The reissued single peaked at No. 28 on Oricon's weekly singles chart and sold over 300,000 copies.

Track listing 
All music is arranged by Makoto Kawaguchi, except where indicated.

Charts

Akina Nakamori version 

Akina Nakamori covered "Kataomoi" as her 28th single, released as a double-A single with "Aibu" on March 24, 1994, by MCA Victor. It was also the lead single from her first cover album Utahime. The single peaked at No. 17 on Oricon's weekly singles chart and sold over 133,900 copies.

Track listing

Charts

References

External links 
Michiru Maki
 

Mie Nakao
 
  (1971)
  (1977)

Akina Nakamori
 
 

1969 songs
1971 singles
1977 singles
1994 singles
Akina Nakamori songs
Japanese-language songs
Victor Entertainment singles
Universal Music Japan singles
MCA Records singles